Carthagena  is an unincorporated community in Mercer County, Ohio, United States.

History

Carthagena was laid out in 1840. It is named after Cartagena, a city in the south-east of Spain.  The village was started by Charles Moore from Harrison County, Kentucky, around the same time Mercer County was established.  Charles Moore was a black man and owned 160 acres of land in Carthagena.  Black people lived in Carthagena for over 100 years, the last known member of the black community in Carthagena was Albert Bowles who died in 1957 and is buried in the black cemetery there.  The land a black school stood on (Emlen Institution) was purchased by the Missionaries of the Precious Blood (C.P.P.S.) for $4,500 on March 14, 1861.  A seminary was built and named "St. Charles Seminary". The St. Charles Center has been operated by the Missionaries of the Precious Blood since then.

References 

Unincorporated communities in Mercer County, Ohio
Unincorporated communities in Ohio
1824 establishments in Ohio
Populated places established in 1824
Populated places established in 1840